Contre-amiral Paul Campion was an admiral in the French Navy.  From 18 February 1904 to 2 February 1905 he was Chief of Staff of the French Navy.

French Navy admirals